British record producer and recording artist Shahid "Naughty Boy" Khan has written and/or produced a total of 49 songs that have been assigned to artists, as well as writing and producing other material which is awaiting allocation. After signing as a songwriter to Sony ATV and then to Virgin Records (now Virgin EMI), Khan established his production company "Naughty Boy Recordings" and production name, and began to write and produce music commercially circa 2008. He got his big break in 2008–09, producing "Diamond Rings", a UK top-ten hit by British grime artist Chipmunk and a then-unknown session singer called Emeli Sandé. He also produced a remix of British R&B singer-songwriter Taio Cruz's 2008 single "Come On Girl". This was followed this in 2010 with his own top-ten hit single, "Never Be Your Woman" featuring British rapper Wiley and Sandé. 2010 would also establish Naughty Boy and Sandé's writing partnership, with the duo working on "Dreamer", "End of Days" and "Yesterday's News" for Devlin's album Bud, Sweat and Beers, Tinie Tempah's "Let's Go" from Disc-Overy, "Radio" for Alesha Dixon, "Kids Love to Dance" for Professor Green's Alive Till I'm Dead album and "Til the End" from Tinchy Stryder's Third Strike album.

2011 remained quiet in terms of commercial releases as Naughty Boy worked on his own album and Sandé debut album. The latter, Our Version of Events, was released in 2012 and was largely a collaboration between Naughty Boy and Sandé. The album would become a success amongst music critics with Metacritic awarding the album a weighted mean score of 67/100. The album was also a large commercial success, selling 1.2 million copies by December 2012 and in April 2013, the Official Charts Company revealed that Our Version of Events had beaten the record for the debut album that had spent the most consecutive weeks in the top-ten on the UK Albums Chart a record previously held by The Beatles' Please Please Me album. It was not until its 66th week on the chart, that the album dropped out of the top-ten. In 2012, the duo also respectively wrote and produced "Trouble", the lead single from Glassheart (2012), the third studio album by British series 3 X Factor winner, Leona Lewis. Another song by the duo called "Mountains" was originally intended for Lewis, but was later reclaimed for Sandé's Our Version of Events. In the latter part of 2012, Naughty Boy also wrote/produced "Half of Me" for Bajan singer Rihanna's seventh album Unapologetic and "Side Effects of You" for American entertainer Fantasia Burrino. Naughty Boy also wrote "Craziest Things" with will.i.am for former Girls Aloud member Cheryl Cole.

Naughty Boy has also co-written songs for his own debut album Hotel Cabana (2013). Eight of the songs are co-written with and feature vocals from Sandé. On the album he also wrote with Andrea Martin, whom had previously collaborated with Naughty Boy for "When it Hurts", another track from Lewis' album Glassheart. Tempah and Professor Green also co-wrote tracks with him, after he previously produced for their albums. Other new collaborators include Ella Eyre, Wiz Khalifa, Bastille, Chasing Grace, Tanika, Maiday, Mic Righteous, Gabrielle, Sam Smith and Wretch 32. Prior to release, Hotel Cabana has produced three top-ten singles, "Wonder" and "Lifted", both featuring Sandé and "La La La" (featuring Smith), which topped the UK Singles Chart. 2013 also saw Naughty Boy resume to work with other artists including Britney Spears, in joint sessions with William Orbit, and Lily Allen.

Songs

References 

Naughty Boy songs
Naughty Boy
Naughty Boy
Naughty Boy
Song recordings produced by Naughty Boy